Arely Franco Ramos (born 30 July 1968) is a Salvadoran sprinter. She competed in the women's 400 metres at the 1996 Summer Olympics.

References

External links
 

1968 births
Living people
Athletes (track and field) at the 1996 Summer Olympics
Salvadoran female sprinters
Olympic athletes of El Salvador
Sportspeople from San Salvador
Central American Games silver medalists for El Salvador
Central American Games medalists in athletics
Olympic female sprinters
20th-century Salvadoran women